John Luther Mercer (born 17 August 1981) is a British politician and former British Army officer who has served as Minister of State for Veterans’ Affairs since October 2022, having previously served from July 2022 to September 2022. He was Parliamentary Under-Secretary of State for Defence People and Veterans from July 2019 to April 2021. Mercer has been Member of Parliament (MP) for Plymouth Moor View since 2015. He is a member of the Conservative Party. 

In April 2021, after notifying the chief whip of his intention to resign his position as Parliamentary Under-Secretary of State, he was dismissed by Prime Minister Boris Johnson. In July 2022, he was appointed Minister for Veterans’ Affairs at the Cabinet Office – attending Cabinet – following Johnson's announcing his intention to resign as Leader of the Conservative Party. Mercer was dismissed from the position in September 2022 by Prime Minister Liz Truss. In October 2022, he was reappointed Minister of State for Veterans' Affairs by Truss’s successor Rishi Sunak.

Early life and career
John Mercer was born in Dartford on 17 August 1981. The son of a banker and a nurse, he grew up in a strict Baptist family with seven siblings. Between 1995 and 2000, he was educated at Eastbourne College, a co-educational independent school in Eastbourne in East Sussex. After completing school, he worked as an intern in the City of London from 2000 to 2002.

Military career
Mercer was commissioned as a second lieutenant in the Royal Artillery after graduating from the Royal Military Academy, Sandhurst, in June 2003 and was promoted to lieutenant in April 2005. Mercer passed the All Arms Commando Course and served mostly with 29 Commando Regiment Royal Artillery and 3rd Regiment Royal Horse Artillery. He served three tours in Afghanistan: as a liaison and training officer with Afghan forces; attached to a Special Forces unit; and as a co-ordinator of artillery and air strikes in support of ground operations. Mercer retired from military service in December 2013 with the rank of captain.

In June 2017, two years after becoming an MP, Mercer published We Were Warriors: One Soldier's Story of Brutal Combat, a memoir of his upbringing and army service, especially his time in Afghanistan.

Mercer worked to help military veterans to obtain a veterans ID card before stepping down from the position of Parliamentary Under-Secretary of State for Defence People and Veterans in April 2021.

Political career

Member of Parliament
Mercer has said publicly that he had not been politically active in his younger years and the first time he voted was for himself when he first ran for office. He said that he entered politics with a view to improving the care of veterans and felt that he was a Conservative because he regarded a "massive welfare state that saps the ambition and drive of a younger generation" as a problem. After contacting ex-military Conservative MP Bob Stewart, he was selected as the Conservative Party candidate for Plymouth Moor View two months after leaving the army in February 2014.

Mercer has said he was largely responsible for organising his own campaign "on the cheap". To raise funds, he worked on building sites and appeared in a Dove shower gel advertisement.

He was elected to the House of Commons as the Member of Parliament for Plymouth Moor View at the 2015 general election, defeating the incumbent Labour MP, Alison Seabeck. Mercer delivered his maiden speech in the House of Commons on 1 June 2015, stating his "main missions" in Parliament to be improving provision for mental health and support for war veterans. He has been critical of the Iraq Historic Allegations Team.

Mercer was opposed to Brexit prior to the 2016 EU referendum. He later said that the result to leave should be respected. Mercer was re-elected with an increased majority at the snap 2017 general election, and has focused on care for veterans.

In July 2018 Mercer appeared in Celebrity Hunted, a Channel 4 television programme where participants go on the run and images are released of them so people can try to track them down. While taking part in the programme he missed the meeting of the Health and Social Care Committee, of which he was a member, shortly before Parliament rose for the summer recess. Mercer defended his decision, stating that he had used his position to raise money for charity and had brought his parliamentary roles into filming.

In October 2018, Mercer took on a second job working 20 hours a month as a consultant to Crucial Academy for a salary of £85,000 (equivalent to £350 per hour). Local Labour candidate Charlotte Holloway accused him of neglecting his constituency duties to earn a "staggering" amount of money. Mercer said the accusation "smacked of political jealousy". In April 2019 the BBC reported that his salary at Crucial Academy was funded by the marketing agent for the failed London Capital and Finance bond scheme, although Crucial Group later denied this.

In an interview with The House magazine in October 2018, Mercer suggested that his values no longer aligned with the current Conservative party leadership and said there would be "absolutely no chance" that he would start as a candidate of the party at this time.

In the House of Commons he has sat on the Defence Committee, the Defence Sub-Committee (2015–19) and the Health and Social Care Committee (2017–19).

On 8 May 2019, Mercer announced that he would no longer support the government's legislative agenda until it ended the system for prosecuting historical allegations against British soldiers, in particular in relation to actions during the British Army's presence in Northern Ireland during the Troubles of the latter third of the twentieth century.

Expenses
Mercer has been challenged over his expenses several times. His campaign to get elected as an MP in 2015 was subsequently the subject of a police investigation following allegations that it breached rules on campaign spending. Mercer admitted to police that his account of expenses had been incorrect, but stated that the errors were minor and his spending had not breached legal limits. The Crown Prosecution Service decided not to charge him, and the case was dropped.

In November 2015, he was criticised by the TaxPayers' Alliance after it was revealed he had purchased five Apple iMac computers on his Commons expenses, rather than 'cheaper equivalents'. Mercer responded that the purchases were appropriate and 'were cheaper than the desktop computers offered to MPs by the House of Commons' official supplier'. He was criticised in May 2016 for claiming £2,500 on expenses for "professional services" on social media management, and in December 2017 the Independent Parliamentary Standards Authority opened an investigation to determine whether Mercer had been paid business expenses he should not have been.

As of 2015, Mercer employed his wife on a part-time basis.

Junior ministerial role
Mercer was an early backer of Boris Johnson in the 2019 Conservative Party leadership election. He said that he believed "Boris is the man of the moment" and was capable of securing a better Brexit deal for the United Kingdom. On 28 July 2019, Mercer was appointed as Minister for Defence People and Veterans in Johnson's government. In the role, Mercer's responsibility includes armed forces personnel and veterans' welfare. Mercer was also tasked by the Prime Minister to focus on ending the legal pursuit of former service personnel, especially those who had served during the Troubles in Northern Ireland.

On 27 September 2019, Mercer was accused of having broken the ministerial code for not resigning from his role at a training firm whilst in government. He held a second job as a director of Crucial Academy Ltd, which retrains former military personnel. Shadow Cabinet ministers Tom Watson and Nia Griffith wrote a letter to the Cabinet Secretary Mark Sedwill asking him to investigate whether Mercer had broken the code through his directorship at the company.

Mercer held his seat in the 2019 general election, increasing his majority to nearly 13,000 votes.

On 20 April 2021, Mercer was "sacked by text" after offering to resign at the end of Wednesday 21 April, but refusing to go earlier. In a tweet, Mercer said he was "relieved of [his] responsibilities in Government" because of his disagreements with the scope of the proposed Overseas Operations Bill. The bill was designed to protect veterans from vexatious allegations but Human Rights Watch argued that the law's enactment would give immunity to British soldiers from prosecution for war crimes and other serious crimes against humanity. Because the bill only covered operations conducted outside the United Kingdom, Mercer said it was a "red line" for him that British soldiers who served in Northern Ireland would be excluded from the Bill. The bill's key proposals were rejected by the House of Lords. Mercer told Times Radio that he thought the Second Johnson ministry was "the most distrustful, awful environment I've ever worked in".

He returned to government after the 2022 British cabinet reshuffle as Minister of State for Veterans' Affairs, attending Cabinet. In July 2022 he was appointed as a member of the Privy Council. He was removed from this position on 6 September 2022 when Liz Truss became prime minister, an act which prompted Mercer's wife to call Truss "an imbecile". Mercer was reappointed to his previous role as Minister of State for Veterans' Affairs, attending Cabinet, following Rishi Sunak's appointment as Prime Minister.

Personal life
Mercer is married to Felicity and they have three children. The family live in a small village on the edge of Bodmin Moor, in Cornwall. For his work in Parliament, Mercer said in 2016 that he stays in a hotel on expenses. When first elected, he slept in East London on his boat several nights a week, stating in The Daily Telegraph at the time that it reduced his expenses costs. After local media reported he had started using hotels instead, he said it was due to the weather conditions and that his expenses claims were still lower than the maximum that could be allowed.

On a summer boat trip in 2016, he rescued fellow Conservative MP Scott Mann who jumped into the water having been "ashamed to admit" he could not swim. In 2018 he won Channel 4's Celebrity Hunted Stand Up to Cancer, sharing the title with AJ Pritchard. In August 2020, Mercer sustained a head injury while canoeing on the Tamar, which was treated at Launceston medical centre; he subsequently spent three nights in Derriford hospital, following an infection complication requiring surgery.

In December 2022, Mercer said that he had received death threats and online abuse from an anonymous person in Plymouth.

Honours

 He was sworn as a member of the Privy Council of the United Kingdom on 19 July 2022, entitling him to the honorific prefix "The Right Honourable" for life.

Notes

References

External links
Official website

Ex-Army heads criticise investigation into Iraq abuse allegations on the BBC website

1981 births
British Army personnel of the War in Afghanistan (2001–2021)
British Army Commandos officers
Conservative Party (UK) MPs for English constituencies
Members of the Parliament of the United Kingdom for constituencies in Devon
Graduates of the Royal Military Academy Sandhurst
Living people
People educated at Eastbourne College
Royal Artillery officers
UK MPs 2015–2017
UK MPs 2017–2019
UK MPs 2019–present
People from Dartford
Members of the Privy Council of the United Kingdom
Politicians from Plymouth, Devon